Daniel Scott Smith (born April 20, 1969) is a former Major League Baseball pitcher. He played in parts of two seasons in the majors, 1992 and 1994, for the Texas Rangers. The former first-round draft pick lefthander now resides in Flower Mound, TX.

Sources

Major League Baseball pitchers
Texas Rangers players
Butte Copper Kings players
Tulsa Drillers players
Oklahoma City 89ers players
Charlotte Rangers players
St. Paul Saints players
West Tennessee Diamond Jaxx players
Greenville Braves players
Richmond Braves players
Creighton Bluejays baseball players
Baseball players from Saint Paul, Minnesota
1969 births
Living people
All-American college baseball players